The Mitsubishi Chariot is an automobile manufactured and marketed by Mitsubishi from 1983 to 2003. It is a small multi-purpose vehicle (MPV). Based on the SSW concept car first exhibited at the 23rd Tokyo Motor Show in 1979, the MPV derives its nameplate from chariots used by the ancient Greek and Roman empires.

Internationally, the MPV has been marketed as the Mitsubishi Space Wagon, Mitsubishi Nimbus and Mitsubishi Expo — and as the Dodge and Plymouth  Colt Vista Wagon, as captive imports in North America, and as the Eagle Vista Wagon in Canada. It has also been manufactured under license as the Hyundai Santamo and Mitsubishi Savrin in Asia.



First generation (1983)

The first generation Chariot (D0#W-series) was produced from February 1983 until May 1991 with a choice of SOHC straight-four powerplants ranging from the 1.6-liter 4G32 to the 2.0-liter 4G63 petrol engines, or the 1.8 liter 4D65T turbo-diesel (from October 1984), mated to a 5-speed manual or 3-speed automatic transmission. It occupied the market segment previously served by the Mitsubishi Galant station wagon.

A van version with an extended fiberglass roof was sold in Finland as the Mitsubishi Space Van. At the time vans were exempt from tax in Finland and the roof was extended to reach the minimum height of cargo space needed to be registered as a van. The fiberglass extensions were produced by boat manufacturer Esboat. The van's top speed was limited to 80 km/h.

From June 1984, a version with permanent four-wheel drive was also offered for the two-liter engined model, while Japanese customers could also get the 4G62 engine in the MR Turbo version from July 1983 until the 1987 model year (1795 cc,  at 5800 rpm). This version could reach , and was also available with the 3-speed automatic.

In Australia, where it was marketed as the "Nimbus", it won the 1984 Wheels Car of the Year award in its debut year. The Nimbus model codes were "UA" (1984), "UB" (1986), and "UC" (1987).

A single 1.8-litre GLX version, with manual or automatic transmission, was assembled from CKD kits in New Zealand by importer Todd Motors (later Mitsubishi NZ Ltd).

Colt Vista
The rebadged Dodge and Plymouth Colt Vista, in Canada also sold as the Eagle Vista Wagon (1989-1991), were introduced in August 1983 as a 1984 model and they were offered in North America until 1991. The Colt Vista was originally available only with front-wheel drive and the 2.0-liter 4G63 engine producing  in US trim. Transmissions were the "Twin-Stick" (4x2 gears), a 5-speed manual, or a 3-speed automatic. Four-wheel drive became an option in the United States in the spring of 1985, while in Canada, the Colt Vista was only marketed with four-wheel drive in several model years including 1986.

The Dodge/Plymouth Colt/Eagle Summit wagons replaced the Vista.

Second generation (1991)

The second-generation Chariot grew in wheelbase, length, width and height while  remaining within Japanese government regulations concerning vehicle exterior dimensions and engine displacement. The G63B engine was replaced with the architecturally similar but updated 4G63 four-cylinder engine, and the turbo-diesel 4G37B was phased out and replaced with a newer and larger 1,997 cc 4D68T powerplant. In 1993, a 2,350 cc 4G64 was added to the range. A five-speed manual, or four-speed automatic could be specified, and in high-end models an INVECS electronically controlled four-speed auto with "fuzzy logic" was also available.

A limited-production 4WD and turbocharged version was offered only in Japan, called the "Resort Runner GT", which borrowed the powertrain from the Lancer Evolution and the Galant VR-4. The Resort Runner GT was a spiritual continuation of the turbocharged first-generation Chariot 1.8MR produced from 1983 through 1987.

The Chariot Resort Runner GT seated seven passengers in a three-row seating arrangement. Second- and third-row seats reclined fully to create a small bed, or folded flat to create a flat load space. A five-passenger two-row version called the Chariot Resort Runner GT-V replaced the third-row bench seat with a cargo tray to create a flat loading surface.

Most other Chariot variants, including the American-market Mitsubishi Expo, featured fully reclining first-, second- and third-row seats that created a larger makeshift bed.  

According to Mitsubishi Motors recall data, approximately 2260 Chariot Resort Runner GT and GT-V models were produced from April 25, 1995 to October 18, 1995, with an additional 155 cars built from
April 25, 1996 to August 27, 1997.

From 1992, a single GLX model was assembled in New Zealand, with manual or automatic transmissions, at Mitsubishi's Porirua plant. Whilst the vehicle was sold in many countries under a variety of names, not all markets received the full range of models. For example, Australia received only front-wheel-drive models powered by the 2.4L 4G64 engine.

In Korea, Hyundai Precision Industry Co., Ltd. built a re-badged version of the second generation Mitsubishi Chariot at its Ulsan Yeompo-dong Plant between 1996 and 2002 and called it the Hyundai Santamo and Galloper Santamo. According to the corresponding article on Korean Wikipedia, the Hyundai Santamo name was an acronym, meaning "SAfety aNd TAlented MOtor".

It was sold at the Philippines as the "Space Wagon MPV" in 1992. Earlier models are powered by Mitsubishi's 1.8L carburated inline-four engine paired to a standard 5-speed manual transmission while later models are powered by Mitsubishi's 1.8L 4G69 four-cylinder engine with electronic fuel injection paired to a 4-speed automatic transmission. By 1999, Mitsubishi dropped the Space Wagon to the lineup without a direct replacement.

Third generation (1997)

The third and final generation was introduced on October 17, 1997, and was larger and heavier again. It was now known in its home market as the Chariot Grandis, after the French grandiose, to emphasise the increase in the car's size and quality as it moved from a ladder frame to monocoque construction, using the company's RISE safety body. Mitsubishi discontinued all other straight-4 engines in favour of a single gasoline direct injection version of the 4G64, while introducing a new 2972 cc SOHC 6G72 V6 powerplant, also GDI-equipped.
For Europe, there were also available 2.0 4G63 SOHC 16 valve engine, which is well known on the 8th generation Galant. The INVECS-II four-speed semi-auto and 5-speed manual transmission were options. Four-wheel-drive version was only available with 2.4 GDI and 5-speed manual transmission. Rear viscous-limited-slip differential was an option. Center differential is also with viscous-coupling-unit. Gearbox and transfer box look similar to Lancer Evolution, but still are different.
For Japanese market, due to the engine size exceeding 2000cc, and the width exceeding 1.7 m, this generation was no longer in compliance with Japanese regulations, and buyers were now liable for additional yearly taxes, which affected sales. The 3.0 litre engine also obligated Japanese buyers to pay more annual road tax which was also a consideration affecting purchases.

This generation was not sold in North America, as the Dodge Caravan and Plymouth Voyager were now sold in regular and extended length vehicles, with the longer models sold as Grand Caravan and Grand Voyager in addition to the Chrysler Town and Country.   It was marketed as a large minivan as a result.

The Chariot Grandis was finally superseded by release of the Mitsubishi Grandis on May 14, 2003, although production of the older vehicle continued until the following year for overseas markets.

Production and sales figures

(Sources: Fact & Figures 2000, Fact & Figures 2005, Mitsubishi Motors website)

References

External links

Chariot
Crossover sport utility vehicles
Compact sport utility vehicles
Compact MPVs
Station wagons
Minivans
Front-wheel-drive vehicles
All-wheel-drive vehicles
Cars introduced in 1983
1990s cars
2000s cars
Cars discontinued in 2006